Squeeze casting is a casting method that combines die casting and forging. It starts with low-pressure casting, followed by the application of very high pressure as the material cools, producing a high-quality casting. This is often carried out using a hydraulic press as part of the casting apparatus.

Squeeze casting was originally created to make stronger metal parts for use in the construction and defense industries. The resulting metal parts created from this process are more resistant to wear and heat and have historically been very expensive to produce. The market for these parts has grown to include the agricultural and automotive industries.

History 
Although several people have been credited with the creation of squeeze casting, the idea of squeeze casting (SC) was first patented in 1819 by Hollinggrak (27) and further developed by Chernov in 1878. Together, the team of scientists devised a new way to combine extremely high temperatures and 15,000 pounds per square inch of pressure to reshape molten metal. Along the way, there were many drawbacks to this creation. Some problems they encountered included combining the exact temperature with the correct pressure in order to form the strongest metal. However, even with so many challenges, it was officially patented in 1994.

One of the greatest drawbacks that inventors of squeeze casting have encountered is the configuration of re-entrant cavities and internal passages that use the core. One of the possible solutions brought up was creating a core from conventional sand coring. Although this method seemed like a valid solution, the high temperatures from molten metal easily penetrated the core made from sand. Along the way, other inventors have also come up with different methods such as using traditional salt cores, but like sand coring, they are equally, if not more susceptible to stress and cracking.

Working on complex processes like squeeze casting, it is easy to focus on one aspect and struggle with another part while working with this metal. For example, it is easy to focus on only weight reduction, and then realize the cost has increased substantially. Other times, costs to produce squeeze casts may drop, all while having the strength of this metal drop proportionally too. But through these surmountable challenges, many inventors have refined the process even more to devise the process we call squeeze casting.

Creating squeeze casts 
 Heat metal to melting temperature
 Inject into die and add 15,000 psi to shape molten metal
 Heat over melting temperature
 Extract material and rinse through water
 Remove metal produced from the die to cool down 
After getting through these challenges, the real benefits of these processes were discovered. Squeeze casting allows for the addition of an insulating layer around the metal core. This results in a layer that prevents the die cavity's heat from melting the core that is being produced. With the insulating layer intact, the construction of this core allows it to be more easily extracted all while leaving behind the protective-insulating layer. Moreover, through this process, a low-cost option of producing squeeze cores that is able to withstand high pressures has been made open to the public.

Market 
The product of this process has many practical applications, but most of its uses lie in the defense industry. Squeeze cast parts are most frequently found in military vehicles because of their strength and durability in areas where it is needed most- this product has the strength to carry about 40 tonnes of pressure. Furthermore, another reason why it is used in so many markets is that it reduces 35% of the weight of most metals. Created just over fifteen years ago, the process continues to get better, to a point where decreasing the price of production has become a priority.

Patents 
The patent for this product can be found on the list of google patents. There, it lists a clear description of each part integral to the function and process used to create squeeze-cast metals. For example, it describes what temperatures and pressures are required, what function each step serves, and how it relates to the whole process.

The original patent holder of squeeze casting was Cmi International Inc., but since then, there have been many patent transfers. All of which, have been companies competing in the same field for a greater share of the market. For example, Gibbs Die Casting Aluminum Corporation, Ube Industries Ltd and Mazda Motor Corporation are all multinational corporations that have contributed and competed for a share of the market. Lastly, even though there are many contenders in the market, most of the companies in this market have been attempting to improve these products by decreasing weight, all while increasing the strength of these metals.

References 

Article on presentation about the squeeze forming process
Article on the squeezeform process

External links 
 http://www.google.com/patents/US5355933
 http://www.gkn.com/structures/media/news/Pages/Squeezeform-process-proven-in-military-vehicles-brings-benefits-to-agricultural-applications.aspx
 http://patents.justia.com/inventor/karl-d-voss
 http://www.gkn.com/structures/aboutus/Pages/what-we-do.aspx

Metalworking
Casting (manufacturing)